Jacksonville School District 117 (JSD 117) is a school district headquartered in Jacksonville, Illinois.

Steve Ptacek became the superintendent in 2012.

Its current attendance boundaries were selected in 2017.

Jewell Mann and Robert Crowe wrote the book Rich History, Bright Future: Celebrating 150 Years of Jacksonville School District #117.

Schools
 Secondary
 Jacksonville High School
 Jacksonville Middle School

 Elementary
 Lincoln Elementary School
 Murrayville-Woodson Elementary School
 North Elementary School
 South Elementary School
 Washington Elementary School

 Early childhood
 Early Years Program

 Alternative schools
 Crossroads Learning Center

References

External links
 Jacksonville School District 117

School districts in Illinois
Education in Morgan County, Illinois
Jacksonville, Illinois